The University of Dyrrachium was a Venetian theological university (Studium generale) in Durrës (Dyrrhachium), Venice, then Republic of Venice. The university was established around 1380, and then transferred to Zadar in 1396,  amid the mounting Turkish threats in South-eastern Europe, thereby becoming the University of Zadar.

The university is the oldest university originating from the historical Venice, and is one of the oldest European universities.

See also 
 Durrës
 Studium generale
 University of Zadar
 Medieval university
 Aleksandër Moisiu University of Durrës

References

Universities in Albania
Durrës
Educational institutions established in the 14th century
1380 establishments in Europe
1396 disestablishments